Mixed Bill is an early British television series which aired on the BBC during 1946. Consisting of three 30-minute episodes, it was a live variety program. For example, one episode featured an accordionist, a vocal group, a singer, and an impressionist. The episode telecast 24 September 1946 aired as part of a schedule which also included a play, boxing, a puppet show, and series Composer at the Piano.

None of the episodes still exist, as methods to record live television had not been developed. (the earliest BBC telerecording of a live TV variety show is from October 1947, consisting of a 6-minute excerpt from the special Variety in Sepia. Another surviving early variety programme is The World Our Stage, a special from 1957)

References

External links
Mixed Bill on IMDb

1940s British television series
1946 British television series debuts
1946 British television series endings
Lost BBC episodes
BBC Television shows
Black-and-white British television shows
British variety television shows
British live television series